Spondylidinae are a small subfamily of Cerambycidae including slightly over 100 species, primarily in the coniferous forests of the Boreal hemisphere. A few species occur in coniferous forests in tropical and subtropical areas (Mexico, Cuba), while very few genera (e.g., Zamium) are present in Austral Africa and Madagascar (e.g., Masatopus). Some sources spell the name as Spondylinae.

Morphology

Adult
Spondylidinae are insects characterised by cerambycine aspect, generally with a more or less flattened, dark body, oblique head and scarcely elongated antennae. Their sexual dimorphism is scarcely evident; males and females are extremely similar. Unlike Cerambycinae, their stridulitrum is divided.

Larva
The larvae are completely different from those of Cerambycinae and similar to those of Lepturinae in several respects, being characterised by a rounded head and large labrum. They also typically possess two closely spaced small spines on the last abdominal segment.

Biology

Adult
Spondylidinae are nearly all nocturnal or crepuscular. Only the genus Tetropium, characterised by finely faceted eyes, has diurnal activity. The adults live on the host plants, taking refuge under barks or trunks during inactive periods.

Larva
Except for some Saphanini (Saphanus, Drymochares) and Anisarthrini, the larvae of most of species attack conifers.

Taxonomy

History
Spondylidinae have a complicated systematic history, and details of the relationships are still uncertain. In 1897 Xambeu united the genera Spondylis, Asemum, Chriocephalus (now Arhopalus) and Tetropium in Spondyliens, on the basis of the larval morphology. Nevertheless, this classification was rejected by contemporaneous authors since Spondylis was believed to be related to Prioninae and Parandra. At that time most spondylidine genera were placed within the subfamily Aseminae. A later study of the wing morphology confirmed Xambeu's grouping, but by the end of the 20th Century (and in some contemporaneous faunas) Spondylidini were treated as a separate subfamily. Only after 1987, after further studies on the larval morphology, was it recognized that spondylidines and asemines were indeed part of the same group, rather than separate lineages. Spondylidini - whose larvae are indistinguishable from that of all other traditional Aseminae - appear to be simply highly derived Asemini, with adult morphology convergent with lucaniform Prioninae and the Vesperidae of the Amazon rainforest genus Migdolus.

Current systematics
Spondylidinae (this name has priority over Aseminae) includes five tribes.

 Anisarthrini Mamaev & Danilevsky, 1973
 Asemini Thomson, 1860
 Atimiini LeConte, 1873
 Saphanini Gistel, 1856
 Spondylidini Audinet-Serville, 1832

References

External links 

Check-list of World-wide Spondylidinae
Gallery of World-wide Spondylidinae
Gallery of American Spondylidinae
Gallery of Japanese Spondylidinae

 
Cerambycidae